Arras Mountain is a  mountain summit located in the Canadian Rockies of British Columbia, Canada. The peak was named in 1921 to commemorate the World War I battlefield at Arras, France, where Canadian troops fought in the first battle April 1917, and in the second battle August 1918. The name was officially adopted in 1924 when approved by the Geographical Names Board of Canada.

Geology
Arras Mountain is composed of sedimentary rock laid down during the Precambrian to Jurassic periods. Formed in shallow seas, this sedimentary rock was pushed east and over the top of younger rock during the Laramide orogeny. The northwest aspect of the mountain conspicuously displays vertically-tilted anticlinal strata.

Climate

Based on the Köppen climate classification, Arras Mountain is located in a subarctic climate zone with cold, snowy winters, and mild summers. Winter temperatures can drop below −20 °C with wind chill factors below −30 °C. Precipitation runoff drains to the Icefall Brook and Valenciennes River.

See also

Geography of British Columbia

References

External links
 Weather: Arras Mountain

Three-thousanders of British Columbia
Canadian Rockies
Kootenay Land District